The 2017–18 season is the 70th season of competitive association football in Honduras.

National teams

Senior team

FIFA World Cup qualification

CONCACAF Gold Cup

Other matches

Olympic team

Central American Games

Other matches
TBA

U-17 team

FIFA U-17 World Cup

Other matches

U-16 team

2017 UNCAF U-16 Tournament

Domestic clubs

Promotion and relegation

Summer transfers

Winter transfers

Liga Nacional

Apertura

Clausura

Liga de Ascenso

Liga Mayor

Honduran Cup

Honduran Supercup

CONCACAF Champions League

CONCACAF League

Other matches

Deaths

References

 
Honduras
Honduras
Football
Football